Sivanandi Rajadurai aka Mylaudy Dr. S. Rajadurai is a scientist in the field of catalysis, physical chemistry, and emission control, focused on protection of the global environment and is a corporate executive. He is chairman of the Rajadurai Foundation.

Education
Rajadurai was born on September 1, 1951, to Sivanandi Nadar and Thayammal Nadachi, in Mylaudy aka Myladi, Tamil Nadu, an agriculture village of Kanyakumari district in Tamil Nadu, India. He completed higher secondary studies at Ringletaube High School in Mylaudy, enrolled in Vivekananda College, Kanyakumari. Rajadurai graduated as valedictorian and as a highly decorated public orator placing first in over fifty regional competitions between 1969 and 1972. Rajadurai subsequently received the university gold medal (top honour) for his post-graduate degree in chemistry at the Mar Ivanios College of University of Kerala. He holds a Ph.D.(Doctor of Philosophy) in physical chemistry from the Indian Institute of Technology Madras and worked closely with J. C. Kuriacose. His doctoral thesis on mixed oxide catalysts guided his future research on the development of solid oxide solutions for pollution abatement. While at IIT, Rajadurai also was captain of the inter-collegiate weightlifting athletic team.

Career

1979–1985: India
Rajadurai held academic positions from 1979 to 1980 at American College, Madurai, and Loyola College, Chennai, from 1980 to 1985 – concurrently as Ph.D. supervisor for the University of Madras. He received Loyola College Best Professor Award and Distinguished Research Professor Award in 1983. During this time, Rajadurai served as a UNESCO representative of India.

1985–2009: United States
In the United States, Rajadurai began his career at the University of Notre Dame and worked also in a number of advanced laboratories around the nation. His associates included J. J. Carberry and C.B. Alcock, with whom he collaborated and developed non-noble metal catalyst and solid oxide solutions, including one rivaling platinum for oxidation and reduction reactions. He developed organic free radicals for polymerization-initiating reactions and studied the photochemical/physical properties using single and dual laser.
Rajadurai transitioned to corporate business in 1990, with a series of senior scientist and executive positions. At Carus Chemicals, he was responsible for generating catalyst formulation process, and developed patents for ozone decomposition catalyst and powder coating techniques. Rajadurai directed Molecular Technology Corporation(MOTEC) catalyst development, reactor designs, and analytical procedures – resulting in solutions for nitrogen oxide(NOx) reduction systems applied in diesel and natural gas operated engines. As a Research Leader of Cummins from 1990 to 1995, Rajadurai developed catalytic aftertreatment systems for diesel engines and was responsible for management of industrial-university catalytic research programs around the United States to investigate quantum chemical modeling for catalyst prediction and microwave-generated free radical injections for nitrogen oxide reduction. While at Tenneco, he established computational simulation for exhaust after treatment system development for the commercial, heavy duty specialty and global emerging markets. His responsibility included North American manufacturing of the ultra thinwall substrate catalytic converter working with Corning Inc. and NGK.  He received Tenneco Innovation Award by recognizing product & process innovation for the development of low noble metal catalytic converter in 1998, Tenneco Automotive General Manager's Leadership Award in 1998 to honor of stellar performance in leadership role and exceptional teamwork, Tenneco Automotive Vision Award in the year 2000 for pioneering global ideas for Cleaner, Quieter and Safer transportation. He was elected as Board of Director of the World's leading Manufacturers of Emission Control Association (MECA), Board of Director of US Fuel Cell Council to develop a clean energy solutions for future, Board of Director of Walker Exhaust India Private Limited in 2001.   While an executive at ArvinMeritor, Rajadurai directed the technology road map, annual operating plan and business strategy. Rajadurai was Vice President of ACS Industries from 2004 to 2009, in-charge of the strategic planning for product and technology development of wire mesh catalyst infrastructure. Rajadurai is an elected fellow of the Society of Automotive Engineers (SAE).

2009–present: India

Rajadurai built a state of the art Research & Development Centre in South India for Sharda Motor Industries Ltd. The capabilities include design, develop and validate exhaust system for emission control & Noise, vibration, and harshness (NVH) control. He has established relationships with elite research institutions and provide professional education to young engineers on challenges and opportunities of globalisation, over-capacity in industries, economic uncertainties and changing consumer demands in the dynamic society. He  initiated green technology centre to motivate professors and students for a global approach to protect the environment from  challenges such as acid rain, global warming, ozone depletion, rainforest deterioration, river contamination, sea level rise, accumulation of hazardous wastes, air pollution and over population. He has been actively involved with SRM Institute of Science and Technology formula racing team. He developed exhaust system to extract maximum performance of engine keeping the sound level lower than 110 dB without exerting excessive back pressure. Rajadurai is Chairman of the Rajadurai Foundation, the mission of which is to advance academic scholarship, professional development, societal welfare, and environmental protection. As a visiting professor, he holds a number of seminars and corporate partnerships with SRM Institute of Science and Technology, Adhiparasakthi college of engineering, Karpagam University, SKR Engineering College, James Engineering College, Annai Vailankanni College of Engineering,  Academy of Maritime Education and Training (AMET) University  and Hindustan University. He facilitates corporate partnership with various universities and colleges. He is a chairman of Industry Institute Interaction Cell (IIIC) in 2011 and Member of Governing Council in 2012, Annai Vailankanni College of Engineering. He is a Member of Research Advisory Board (National) & Board of Research in 2018, Hindustan Institute of Technology & Science. He is a Board of Studies Member in 2018 & Member of Advisory Committee in 2019, Bannari Amman Institute of Technology. He is a Member of Internal Quality Assurance Cell (IQAC) & Institution Innovation Council (IIC), 2019, Academy of Maritime Education and Training (AMET) University.

Achievements 
Rajadurai received SAE India Southern Section Lifetime Accomplishment Award in 2017 for his contribution on automobile product and process innovation & design for competitive advantage. He received Dr. K.C.G. Verghese Excellence Award in 2017 from Hindustan Group of Institutions for his Research Achievements. He received Bharat Gaurav National Award for his outstanding excellence and remarkable achievements in the field of Teaching, Research & Publications from IRDP Group of Journals in 2020.

Publications 
Rajadurai has done extensive research in the area of fundamental chemistry such as photochemistry and photophysics, nano-second kinetics of free radicals and transients, Catalysis, catalytic converter development, Emission control, computational simulations and applications,  exhaust system development, environmental pollution & CO2 control and program management in international scientific journals.

Scientific presentations 
He has presented several research findings in International conferences such as Diesel Engine-Efficiency and Emissions Research (DEER) Conference, International Conference for Solar Conversion, Fifth National Catalysis Symposium, Society Automotive Engineers (SAE) Congress International Conference on Automotive Materials & Manufacturing, FISITA, Asian PowerTrain Conference, GT Conference.

References

External links
SAE-India Collegiate Club inauguration at Annai Vailankanni College of Engineering
NKI Scholar

1951 births
Living people
Scientists from Chennai
People from Kanyakumari district
Indian development specialists